MVP Sports Stars were plush pillow dolls created by Ace Novelty Company released around 1991 and 1992  The sport for which they played was given a name (i.e. 'Tackling Dummies' for Football).

Plush pillow characters
Below is a list of these athletes who had plush pillow dolls made of them:

(Hoopster Heroes): Magic Johnson, Larry Bird, Patrick Ewing, 
(Tackling Dummies): Troy Aikman, Dan Marino, Jim Kelly, Joe Montana, Randall Cunningham, Warren Moon, Boomer Esiason
(Power Skaters): Mario Lemieux, Brett Hull, Wayne Gretzky
(Super Sluggers): Nolan Ryan, Ryne Sandberg, Jose Canseco, Ken Griffey Jr

References

External links
 https://inventively.com/search/trademarks/owner/ACE%20NOVELTY%20CO.,%20INC.
 https://www.amazon.ca/Sports-Gretzky-Power-Skaters-Pillow/dp/B00O9CQP9U

1990s toys
Pillows
Celebrity dolls
Stuffed toys